Edson Aparecido Martins dos Santos (born August 1, 1982), known as Grillo Edson, is a Brazilian former football player.

External links
 
 
 Grillo Edson at Labtof.ro
  kuniyw.com Profile
  CBF Profile

1982 births
Living people
Brazilian footballers
Brazilian expatriate footballers
Association football midfielders
Expatriate footballers in Romania
Brazilian expatriate sportspeople in Romania
Liga I players
CS Gaz Metan Mediaș players
Guarani FC players